Talia Jay Saunders (born 24 October 1986) is an Australian badminton player. Saunders won the mixed doubles title at the Australian National Badminton Championships with three different partners in 2011, 2013, 2014 and 2015. At the Oceania Championships, she reach the semi final round in the women's doubles event in 2012 and 2015; mixed doubles in 2014 and 2015; and in the women's singles in 2015. Her best achievement was when she reach the women's doubles final in 2015 and won a silver with Jennifer Tam.

Achievements

Oceania Championships 
Women's singles

Women's doubles

Mixed doubles

References

External links 
 

Living people
1986 births
Sportspeople from Adelaide
Australian female badminton players